Bram van Polen (born 11 October 1985) is a Dutch footballer who plays as a defender for PEC Zwolle in the Eredivisie. A product of the Vitesse Arnhem youth academy, where he never played an official match, he is currently in his 16th season for PEC Zwolle, having become a club icon.

Honours

Club
PEC Zwolle
KNVB Cup (1): 2013–14
Johan Cruijff Shield (1): 2014
Eerste Divisie (1): 2011–12

References

External links
 
 Career stats & Profile - Voetbal International

1985 births
Living people
People from Nijkerk
Association football fullbacks
Dutch footballers
VVOG players
SBV Vitesse players
PEC Zwolle players
Eredivisie players
Eerste Divisie players
Footballers from Gelderland